Lajla Mattsson Magga (born 4 November 1942) is a Southern Sami teacher, children's writer and lexicographer. Married to fellow Sami linguist Ole Henrik Magga (born 1947), she lives in Kautokeino in the far northern Norwegian county of Finnmark.

Biography
Born in Kali in central Sweden's Åre Municipality, Magga is the daughter of the reindeer herder Gustaf Edvard Mattson (1897–1973) and Elin Margareta Larsson (1887–1973), also a reindeer herder. A qualified teacher, she attended the University of Oslo where she studied the South Sami language. She has a wide field of interest, comprising fiction and non-fiction, translation, teaching, acquisition of language material, and lexicography. In addition to teaching South Sami in both Norway and Sweden, she has acted as an examiner for the Nord-Trøndelag University College.

In 1984, she published her first book Maahke ryöknie, followed by other children's books and textbooks. Magga has carried out research on the South Sami language and its terminology, leading for example to the standardization of place names.

In 1993, together with Knut Bergsland, she published the Southern Sami-Norwegian dictionary Åarjelsaemiendaaroen baakoegaerja/Sydsamisk-norsk ordbok. She had also published children's books in the South Sami language as well as a Norwegian-South Sami dictionary.

In 2010, Magga was awarded the Nordic Sami language prize, Gollegiella. Not only had Magga taught Southern Sami for many years, she had also published dictionaries. She was currently working on a translation of the Bible into South Sami and was writing a grammar of South Sami together with her husband.

References

1942 births
Living people
People from Kautokeino
People from Åre Municipality
University of Oslo alumni
Norwegian Sámi people
Norwegian children's writers
Norwegian women children's writers
Norwegian lexicographers
Norwegian women non-fiction writers 
Norwegian Sámi-language writers
Linguists of Sámi
Swedish emigrants to Norway